Marie Joseph Émile Gaston Mâzuc (1832-1905) was a lawyer, landowner and scholar of the languages and dialects of the Languedoc region of France.

He was born on 24 July 1832 in Pézenas, Hérault, France, and was educated at the private school of the Abbey of Sorèze.

Mâzuc was married to Marie Dupuy and they had three children. In 1899, he lived in the Château of Roquelune, in Pézenas.

Legacy
Rue Émile Mâzuc in Pézenas is named for him.

Bibliography
 Grammaire Languedocienne, Dialecte de Pézenas, Toulouse: 1899, Slatkine Reprints, Geneva: 1970

Of the original printing, L de G wrote in Revue des Pyrënëes, Volume 11, 1899:

What will be appreciated above all is the considerable labor and the wisdom that [his work] has needed. It will be, in any case, a precious document to consult by all who are interested in our old Langue d'oc in its many local dialects."

 Lou Viache d'Eneas as Enfers, Barchalado en Lengache de Pezenas, Toulouse: 1901

References

1832 births
1905 deaths
19th-century French lawyers
Linguists
People from Hérault